A drum circle is any group of people playing (usually) hand-drums and percussion in a circle. They are distinct from a drumming group or troupe in that the drum circle is an end in itself rather than preparation for a performance. They can range in size from a handful of players to circles with thousands of participants.
Drum circles are related to other community-based music gatherings such as flute circles or vocal improvisation groups.

In 1991, during testimony before the United States Senate Special Committee on Aging, Grateful Dead drummer Mickey Hart stated:
Typically, people gather to drum in drum "circles" with others from the surrounding community. The drum circle offers equality because there is no
head or tail. It includes people of all ages. The main objective is to share rhythm and get in tune with each other and themselves. To form a group consciousness. To entrain and resonate. By entrainment, I mean that a new voice, a collective voice, emerges from the group as they drum together.

Types of group drumming and drum circles
Drum circles originated in the United States during the late 1960s and early 1970s for any group of people, particularly counterculture groups, who gather (informally) to play music together. The terms "drum jam" or "jam session" could be substituted.  Settings include beaches, parks, concert parking lots, festivals, and retreats.  The determining criteria for a drum circle are that the music is improvised and co-created by the participants. Drum circles may or may not be open to the public, but the music is always a group expression, not constrained by genre, instrumentation, or directed by one person or sub-group.

In Western countries, drum circles have developed into two main types: 

Community – free-form drumming, often open to the public and entirely improvised in-the-moment.
 
Facilitated or Conducted – group drumming that is musically directed by a specific person, often called a facilitator or conductor.

All forms of drum circles are used in a variety of settings and applications including; team building, recreational music-making, wellness, education, celebrations, spirituality, personal growth, etc.

The community drum circle
Community drum circles are informal gatherings of people who meet for the purpose of playing drums together. They often take place in public settings such as parks or at the beach, but may also be organized via a community center or similar body. Instrumentation centers around drums and percussion, but may include other instruments, such as flutes, didgeridoos, and other non-percussion instruments.  Practically anything that can be banged on to make noise can be used as a percussion instrument such as cans, buckets, pipes, etc.  One need not possess or purchase a drum to participate. Community drum circles differ from facilitated or conducted drum circles in that the music is entirely improvised through a process of group interaction. There may be a facilitator or moderator who acts to shape the experience through discrete actions, such as helping to maintain a steady beat, helping those who need it, and generally managing the environment to see that everyone is able to participate fully. The participants make up the music as they go along, using their listening and playing skills to make musical connections and express themselves in any and all ways that feel right. Participation is voluntary and often includes drumming, singing or chanting, dancing, and listening. Community drum circles often attract both regular and drop-in participants of all ages and can take place just about anywhere. Community drum circles are the original and most popular form of improvised community drumming.

The facilitated or conducted drum circle

A "facilitated" drum circle is a form of group drumming in which a person seeks to focus the intent and improve the quality and effect of the activity, making it easier for people to effectively participate by taking a more directive approach. The facilitator (leader) takes responsibility for the physical space, arranging chairs and instruments to optimize communication and connection in the group. Facilitators may provide a range of instruments to create a full and balanced percussion orchestra. In this way, the experience can be thought of as a "standardized drumming circle," as opposed to the more free-flowing and open community drum circle. The facilitator is constantly monitoring the music in the group, and generally being encouraging and accepting of participant ideas. In this way, the facilitator takes on a role similar to that of a music teacher or drumming instructor whose goal is to empower the participants and encourage them to share their ideas. In the beginning, the facilitator directs the music through verbal and non-verbal cueing. Cues, which often mirror the movements of an orchestral conductor, are directed at the participants, who respond to the leader. This creates a leader/follower dynamic between the facilitator and the participants. Actions such as rolling (rumbling), starting, stopping, raising/lowering the volume, accents, and when to play/not play are often given by the facilitator. Conducting is not normally part of a traditional (community) drum circle, and therefore makes this type of circle a unique experience and very different from a community circle. Facilitators with training and experience in other areas and professions, such as music education, music therapy, and corporate training, may use a  range of tools and approaches that enable them to work with diverse populations. These types of experiences are more accurately referred to as 'drumming programs,' rather than drum circles, in the traditional sense.

Other forms of drumming 
Other forms of drumming that are related to drum circles include:
 "Guided Interactive Drumming" – highly structured drumming-based programs that are led by an individual or group to reach non-musical goals.
 "Drum Classes" – education-based drumming for the purposes of building musical skills and knowledge.
 "Drum Ensembles" – performance-oriented drumming groups who practice and perform music on drums, often for dance.
 "Clinical Improvisation" – a drumming group within a Music Therapy session, led by a certified Music Therapist.

Group drumming with a spiritual focus

Neotribalism
Is an inclusive way of life that is focused on creating a positive enhancement of self of identity while enforcing a no harm to the collective group attitude.  Neotribalism belief system is evident in the music of Neotribalism; the postmodern drum circle where the only leader is the preservation of the groove or music consciousness this development of musical consciousness takes the participation of individual to create a collective more powerful and beautiful display of sight and sound. "In beat life begins and it is only the maintenance and sacred keeping of the beat that life will endure".

Neopaganism
Neopagans have created another type of drum circle.  At Neopagan festivals, people gather around a large bonfire, the drummers generally sitting on one side to encourage better listening.  The musicians sit together and play while dancers dance and circle around the fire. Often, those present will stay and play throughout the night until dawn, treating the evening as a magical (or alchemical) working. Sound is not limited to drumming alone; there is also chanting, singing, poetry, and spoken word pieces. This type of drum circle is not usually facilitated.

Shamanic drumming circles
This type of circle tends to center around Native American Cultural drums and rattles but is primarily focusing on the spiritual rather than the musical aspects of the culture. It is a facilitated circle but the leader is facilitating a shamanic journey process rather than a musical event.  Shamanic drumming is generally simple and repetitive, often considered as a form of prayer or method of trance induction, rather than as music or entertainment.  During a shamanic trance or shamanic journey, the shaman uses the steady beat of the drum as a "lifeline" to find the way back to the world of ordinary consciousness. Note that in these cultures, the term "Drum Circle" would certainly not be used. Rather, the terms 'drumming ceremony" or "ceremonial drumming" would be more accurate.

Medicine wheel drumming and prayer ceremony

Practiced by various groups, and outlined step-by-step in the book, "Finding Sanctuary in Nature: Simple Ceremonies in the Native American Tradition for Healing Yourself and Others," by Jim PathFinder Ewing (page 147), "the medicine wheel drum circle prayer ceremony" recognizes the four directions—east, south, west, north—as spiritual Powers that can help balance and heal. The ceremony has four rounds, with drumming by all participants at the instruction of the leader allowing the energy of each direction in each round to come into the circle to facilitate prayers and healing. It has been described as "like a sweat lodge without the sweat" (page 148, Finding Sanctuary). Ewing held these ceremonies each month for seven years, as outlined in the book, in addition to shamanic drum circles, and at various sites from coast to coast in the United States since the late 1990s. Groups based on his example and the instructions outlined in the book have resulted in other groups forming worldwide. This description is not of a drum circle in the sense that the term is commonly used. It is a drumming ceremony that takes place in a circle, but very different in content and form than a drum circle, more of an improvised community drumming jam. This type should probably be listed under shamanic or spiritual drumming and not under drum circles.

Notable figures in the group drumming movement
Commercial drum circle groups and companies exist in most countries to serve various markets. There is also a growing body of people working in places such as hospitals, prisons, and hospices using drumming as a form of recreational and supportive music making. Music therapists often use various forms of group drumming (including improvised drumming) in their work to reach therapeutic goals and objectives.  

USA
Mickey Hart
Arthur Hull 
Kalani

References 
Notes

Bibliography
The Healing Power of the Drum, by Robert Lawrence Friedman, MA.
Finding Sanctuary in Nature: Simple Ceremonies in the Native American Tradition for Healing Yourself and Others, by Jim PathFinder Ewing (Nvnehi Awatisgi), Findhorn Press, Scotland, 2007.
 Freestyle Community Drum Circles, by Rick Cormier.

External links
 Drum Circle Resources - Online drum circle finder. Locate drumming events worldwide near you.
 Drum Circle Magazine - An online and print magazine for drum circle enthusiasts
 The Health Benefits of Drumming - An article exploring the health benefits of drumming including the impact of drum circles on the immune system.
 How Learning To Drum Can Improve Your Health and Wellbeing -Discover why learning to drum can benefit mental and physical health.
 The Tree, the Drum, and the River: Cultivating Transpersonal Unity from the Seeds of Our Diversity - Joshua S. Levin

Percussion ensembles
Music therapy
Medicine drums